A steam fair or (steam rally) is a regular organised gathering of historic steam-powered vehicles and machinery, open to the public. Typical exhibits include: traction engines, steam rollers, steam wagons, and steam cars. Often, the scope is widened to include other historic exhibits such as stationary engines, internal-combustion -powered road transport, agricultural and construction vehicles, working horses, woodcraft and the like.

A typical steam fair consists of: 
 A parade ring or track in which vehicles may be demonstrated
 Trade and craft stalls related to the exhibits
 Areas where vehicles may be examined more closely and the public may talk to owners and operators
 Entertainment areas (often, a beer tent) with food, drink, and evening music
 A fairground area may also be included in the event

The following is a geographic list of these gatherings, some of which are referred to as rallies or as festivals. The list does not include static steam museums unless they host a particular event that falls into the classification.

In addition there are some travelling shows powered by steam.  Where these are referred to as steam fairs they are included in the list.

Australia
Scoresby Steamfest
 Lake Goldsmith steam rally (Twice yearly)
Hunter Valley Steamfest
Steam Rally Echuca Moama
SteamFest Tasmania at Sheffield

Canada
Steam-Era - (Milton, Ontario)
Threshermen's Reunion – (Austin, Manitoba)
 Georgian Bay Steam Show _ (Cookstown, Ontario)

Ireland
Eyrecourt
Innishannon Steam and Vintage Rally – (1998- )
Stradbally - Irish National Steam Rally – (1965- )
Upton Steam Rally – ( -1997)

Netherlands
Dordt in Stoom, Dordrecht - (1985- ) bi-annual large event in and around the historic harbour district with steam powered ships, trains, river boats and other engines.

Poland

Wolsztyn – (1993- ) annual steam locomotive parade held the last weekend of April near a historic roundhouse
Chabówka – (2005- ) "Parowozjada" - steam locomotive parade held the last weekend of August in a railway museum near the railway station

United Kingdom

Static events

Travelling shows
Carter's Steam Fair – (1976- ) A travelling funfair that travels throughout London and the home counties from Easter to Bonfire Night.

United States

Antique Gas & Steam Engine Museum - bi-annual show in Vista, California
Antique Powerland, Brooks Oregon. Annual Steam-Up
Antique Power and Steam Show - Large annual show taking place in the Lake County Fairgrounds in Indiana.
Badger Steam and Gas Show - Annual show hosted by Badger Steam and Gas Engine Club near Baraboo, WI
 The Buckley Old Engine Show in Buckley Michigan
K&O Steam and Gas Engine Show, Windfield Kansas.
Central North Dakota Steam Thresher's Reunion – (1958- )
The Dover Steam Show – (1964- ) Annual show hosted by Tuscarawas Valley Pioneer Power Association
Great Steamboat Race - (1963- ) annual round trip race from Louisville, Kentucky to Jeffersonville, Indiana and back between steamboats on the Ohio River
Old Thresher's Reunion - (1960- ) Labor Day weekend, Mount Pleasant, Iowa.
National Threshers Association (1944- ) annual reunion/show held in Wauseon, Ohio, last full weekend of June
Northwest Ohio Antique Machinery Association Antique Machinery Show - Findlay, OH
Nowthen Threshing Show - Annual show held on the third full weekend (Friday-Sunday) in August, in Nowthen, Minnesota.
Pageant of Steam - (1960- ) annual fair held in Canandaigua, New York
Pawnee Steam and Gas Engine Show - held first full weekend in May in Pawnee, OK
Pioneer Engineers Club of Rushville, IN - yearly show in Rushville, IN
Pioneer Steam and Gas Engine Society - Sagertown, PA.
Rock River Thresheree Edgerton, Wisconsin – (1955- ) 
Rough and Tumble Engineers Historical Association Kinzers, Pennsylvania
 Shenandoah Valley Steam & Gas Engine Association, Berryville, VA "Pageant of Steam" held each year the last full weekend in July
Soule’ Live Steam Festival and Railfest annual event held the first weekend in November in Meridian, MS.
Southeast Old Threshers' Reunion annual event held July 1-July 5 in Denton, NC 
Steamstock: An Antiquarian Exposition in Point Richmond, CA is an annual event held in July in a former Ford motor factory, next to the Rosie the Riveter Museum.
Tall Stacks - held every 3 or 4 years in Cincinnati, Ohio since 1988; is a fair for steam powered riverboats.
Tuckahoe Steam & Gas Association near Easton, MD - annual "Steam Show" (1973- ) in early July.
Western Minnesota Steam Thresher's Reunion (WMSTR) Rollag, Minnesota
Western New York Gas & Steam Engine Association Annual Rally - Alexander, NY
Cama Powerup Spring and Fall  Kent, CT 
Missouri River Valley Steam Engine Association Back to the Farm Reunion  Boonevill, MO 
Riverbend Steam and Gas Association  Allendale, MI 
The Michigan Steam Engine and Threshers Club Reunion, Mason, MI.

See also

Live steam
Hollycombe Steam Collection – essentially a steam fair, but in the form of a museum
Thursford Collection – steam museum featuring traction engines

Notes

External links
List of UK Steam Fairs
UK Traction engine rallies
Live listings of UK Steam and Vintage Events (Visitors may also submit to this Events Guide)
 "Old Glory" Online Guide to UK Events including steam rallies and fairs (dynamic list) - from the Old Glory magazine
(Old Glory also publishes a 'Free' paper version at the start of each year listing UK Events.)
Search for steam fairs near you (UK only)

 
Steam
Steam